Mount Binuluan (also known as Ambalatungan) is a remote volcano in the Kalinga province of the Cordillera Administrative Region of the Philippines. The  mountain is part of the Cordillera Central mountain range on Luzon island, the largest island in the country. Binuluan exhibits active volcanism through numerous fumarole fields, solfataras and hot springs on its slope. There were reports of possible eruptions in 1952 and 1986 (or 1987), but they are unverified.

Geography
Mount Binuluan is one of the highest peaks in the area. The mountain is surrounded by the municipalities of Lubuagan, Pasil and Tinglayan in Kalinga province.

Southeast of the mountain is the Chico River flowing from southwest to northeast direction, while due northwest of the mountain is Pasil River, also flowing from southwest to northeast direction merging with Chico River just past the mountain. Mount Binuluan belongs to a range of mountains situated between the two rivers, trending southwest to northeast. Just southwest of Binuluan is Mount Mosimus , followed by Mount Cauitan  and Mount Alchan (Alchanon) , the 19th and 20th tallest mountain in the Philippines. South of this line of mountains are Mount Chumangil  and Mount Patoc , the other volcano of the Central Cordillera Range displaying strong fumarolic activity.

Geology
The Smithsonian Institution's Global Volcanism Program list Binuluan under the Ambalatungan Group. The Bumabag and Podakan volcanoes could possibly be flank vents of Mount Binuluan.

The Philippines Institute of Volcanology and Seismology (PHIVOLCS) lists Binuluan or Ambalatungan as an inactive volcano.

Geothermal features
Mount Binuluan exhibits a number of active geothermal features. There are a number of sites with strong steam emission, fumarolic activity, surface sulfur deposits, hot fresh water springs, hot sulfurous water springs, sulfur staining of riverine rocks, poisonous gas emissions, recent volcanic gas related deaths (>100 in last 20 years at Batong Buhay mines alone), heat destruction of vegetation, poisonous water, fumarole fields with new and shifting activity.

Bu-ot Fumarole Field
The Bu-ot Fumarole Field (Balatoc dialect) is located on Balatoc tribal land, along the Pasil River on the steep western valley slope, with the path going up to Balatoc village immediately to the right of the fumarole field.

Bum-bag Fumarole Fields

Field 4, located about  SE of Field 2 is believed to have the largest surface deposit of sulfur among the fields and is the most active. Field May 4 be consistent with the GVP's 'Podakan Volcano'.

Sugo-oc fumarole field

Hot Springs

Sun-ut hot spring

Bunog Falls and hot springs

Possible eruptions
A possible phreatic or steam eruption was reported from Mount Binuluan in 1952, during which a sulfur-rich debris flow killed a dozen people. Details about the eruption in 1952 are still scant. In 2007 and 2008, some 90- and 100-year-old elders in Brgy. Tulgao in Tinglayan said the loss of life in 1952 was caused by an eruption during a typhoon followed with the collapse of a natural earth bank below Sugo-oc fumarole field, high on the northern side of the Bunog River. The consequent mudslide buried a few houses below near the villages of Dananao and Sumadel, Tinglayan, killing maybe 12 people or thereabouts.

In 2007 and 2008, people in southern Kalinga around Binuluan spoke of an 'eruption' at Sugo-oc in 1986 or 1987. During the Abra earthquake at 20:16 hours on Sunday, January 13, 2008, buildings in Tinglayan shook and windows rattled for about 10 seconds.

There were reports about that earthquake of 1986, which was felt also felt throughout the municipality of Lubuagan, was simultaneous with an eruption at Sugo-oc resulting in the ejection of ash and rock. Three people in Dananao village were killed by the ejected rocks. Because of these, there was a large migration out of the village with the Dananao people taking possession of a land along the Tubuk-to-Aurora Road in eastern Kalinga and resettling there.

See also
List of active volcanoes in the Philippines
List of potentially active volcanoes in the Philippines
List of inactive volcanoes in the Philippines

References

External links
Philippine Institute of Volcanology and Seismology (PHIVOLCS), List of Inactive Volcanoes
PHIVOLCS classification of volcanoes

Active volcanoes of the Philippines
Landforms of Kalinga (province)
Subduction volcanoes
Volcanoes of Luzon
Mountains of the Philippines
Stratovolcanoes of the Philippines